Zedd (born 1989) is a Russian-German music producer and DJ.

Zedd may also refer to:

 Lord Zedd, a fictional character in the Power Rangers television series
 Zeddicus Zu'l Zorander, a fictional character in the Sword of Truth fantasy series by Terry Goodkind
 Nick Zedd (1958-2022), American filmmaker

See also
 Z (disambiguation)
 Zed (disambiguation)